Osternienburg is a village and a former municipality in the district of Anhalt-Bitterfeld, in Saxony-Anhalt, Germany. Since 1 January 2010, it is part of the municipality Osternienburger Land. It is situated approximately 6 km northeast of Köthen (Anhalt), and 15 km west of Dessau-Rosslau.

Former municipalities in Saxony-Anhalt
Osternienburger Land
Duchy of Anhalt